The R16 is a line of Rodalies de Catalunya's regional rail service, operated by Renfe Operadora. It runs southwards from the Barcelona area to the town of Tortosa, passing through the Vallès Occidental, Baix Llobregat, Garraf, Baix Penedès, Camp de Tarragona, Baix Ebre and Montsià  regions.

History

Earlier, all the regional rail services carrying out the line Barcelona-Tarragona-Tortosa-Ulldecona were branded as Ca1 for the Catalan rail division, and 32 in the nationwide regional rail network. Its initial alignment used the line close to the coast passing through Salou, Cambrils and L'Hospitalet de l'Infant. On 13 January 2020, the line's alignment was partially altered, as a result of the opening of a new inland line between Tarragona and L'Ametlla de Mar, and the closure of the coastal line.

List of stations
The following table lists the name of each station served by line R16 in order from south to north; the station's service pattern offered by R16 trains; the transfers to other Rodalies de Catalunya lines, including both commuter and regional rail services; remarkable transfers to other transport systems; the municipality in which each station is located; and the fare zone each station belongs to according to the Autoritat del Transport Metropolità (ATM Àrea de Barcelona) fare-integrated public transport system and Rodalies de Catalunya's own fare zone system for Barcelona commuter rail service lines.

Notes

References

External links
 Rodalies de Catalunya official website
 Schedule for the R16 (PDF format)
 Official Twitter accounts by Rodalies de Catalunya for lines R16 with service status updates (tweets usually published only in Catalan)
 R16 (rodalia 16) on Twitter. Unofficial Twitter account by Rodalia.info monitoring real-time information about the R16 by its users.
 Information about the R16 at trenscat.cat 

16
Railway services introduced in 2010